Catherine Plantagenet may refer to:
Katherine of England (1253–1257), daughter of Henry III of England 
Catherine of York (1479–1527), daughter of Edward IV of England
Katherine of Lancaster (1373–1418), queen of Castile and daughter of John  of Gaunt 
Lady Catherine Gordon (died 1537), wife of pretender Perkin Warbeck, who claimed to be Richard Plantagenet, Duke of York
Katherine Plantagenet, illegitimate daughter of Richard III and second wife of William Herbert, 2nd Earl of Pembroke